Phạm Xuân Mạnh (born 9 February 1996) is a Vietnamese footballer who plays as a midfielder for V.League 1 club Sông Lam Nghệ An.

AFC U-23 Championship
Phạm Xuân Mạnh was included in Vietnam U23 squad for the 2018 AFC U-23 Championship in China.

Honours

Club
Song Lam Nghe An
 Vietnamese Cup: 2017

International
Vietnam U23
 AFC U-23 Championship runners-up: 2018
 M-150 Cup third place: 2017

References 

1996 births
Living people
Vietnamese footballers
Association football midfielders
V.League 1 players
Song Lam Nghe An FC players
People from Nghệ An province
Footballers at the 2018 Asian Games
Asian Games competitors for Vietnam